Abd al-Wahhab ibn Abd al-Rahman ibn Rustam, was the second imam of the Imamate of Tahart and founder of the Wahbi Ibadism movement. He was part of the Rustamid dynasty that ruled a theocracy in what is now Tunis and Algeria. He became ruler after the death of his father, Abd al-Rahman ibn Rustam and founded an external Islamic religious movement called Wahhabism relative to his name Abd al-Wahhab. His Ibadi Kharijite preaching is often incorrectly associated with the modern day Wahhabi movement.

Early life 
Abd al-Wahhab was born in 747/748. His father was a Persian Ibadi Muslim imam, Abd al-Rahman ibn Rustam, the founder of the Rustamid dynasty. He studied Abu Ubayda Muslim ibn Abi Karima's ideas and beliefs under his father, who was also a transmitter of Ibadi tradition. He received the state after the death of his father in 788. In 789, he let Idris I to capture Tlemcen without any negative reaction. He died, probably, in the year 823/824.

References

External links
 https://archive.org/details/akbaralaima

740s births
824 deaths
9th-century imams 
Medieval Algerian people

9th-century monarchs in Africa
Ibadi Muslims
Slave owners